Song Deokbong (1521-1578) was a Korean female poet of the mid Joseon dynasty, and was active in the sixteenth century.

Life
Song Deokbong married the Confucian scholar (Miam) Yu Huichun (1513-1577), who was exiled in 1547. When he boasted of his faithfulness to her, she reprimanded him in letters by saying his boasting of such matters did not do him any credit. She furthermore let him know that she had diligently mourned his mother for three years and arranged the funeral, which she implied were much more difficult tasks than remaining faithful. She also commented that spending some months without sexual relations would have been good for him, seeing as he was getting older and needed to preserve his energy. He took her admonishment without rancor and they continued to correspond with each other in verse.

On her way to visit her husband in exile in Jongseong, Song Deokbong composed a much-praised poem whilst passing through an area called Macheonryeong. 

She was seen as a virtuous woman writer.

Notes

Sources
 

Korean women poets
16th-century Korean poets
16th-century Korean women writers